The Galician Assembly was the joint session of the regional oblast councils of Lviv, Ternopil and Ivano-Frankivsk  on February 16, 1991 in Ukraine (at the time part of the Ukrainian Soviet Socialist Republic). The assembly approved an agreement of cooperation between the three regional councils in political, economic, scientific, humanitarian and cultural spheres to counterbalance the political instability in the Soviet Union.

See also
Regionalism in Ukraine

History of Eastern Galicia
Political history of Ukraine